Carlos Roberto de Carvalho, also known as Carlos Roberto (born 1 May 1948 in Rio de Janeiro), is a former footballer and current Brazilian manager who played in the 1960s and 1970s. He played as midfielder.

Career

Player 

Carlos Roberto was a long-time professional soccer player

He was first selected for the Brazil national football team at the age of 21. Although he was not selected to the squad for the 1970 FIFA World Cup finals, he was part of manager Zagallo's build-up to the finals.

After Botafogo, he played for Santos, Atlético Paranaense, Bangu and CSA, where he finished his playing career.

Trainer 

Carlos became the trainer for Al-Thai of Saudi Arabia. It was his first experience in the Middle East and he was very successful. He returned to Brazil to train America-MG. His international experience continued when he went to Asia to command the Thailand national team.

He returned to Saudi Arabia to train Al Shabab FC (Riyadh) . Back in Minas Gerais he trained time to command Rio Branco. Then he went for the third time to Saudi Arabia, to train Al-Ansar SC and later Al Shabab FC (Riyadh).

Next he became manager for Alvinegro. Moving again, he worked in the Arab Emirates. On 4 March 2007, Carlos Robert became the manager of America Football Club (RJ). In 2008, he commanded the Madureira in the Carioca Championship, having left the position to work in the exterior.

Carlos took charge of Thailand Premier League side Bangkok Glass in June 2009 as a technical director and in 2010 as a head coach.

He took the head coaching job for Muangthong United after René Desaeyere in January 2011. However, his Muangthong United lost on penalties to Indonesia's Sriwijaya in the 2011 AFC Champions League qualifying play-off, eliminating them from the tournament.

Honours
 Botafogo
 Taça Guanabara: 2006
 Campeonato Carioca: 2006

 Bangkok Glass
 Singapore Cup: 2010

References

1948 births
Living people
Brazilian footballers
Campeonato Brasileiro Série A players
Brazilian football managers
Campeonato Brasileiro Série A managers
Expatriate football managers in Saudi Arabia
Expatriate football managers in Thailand
Brazilian expatriates in Saudi Arabia
Brazilian expatriate sportspeople in Thailand
Botafogo de Futebol e Regatas players
Santos FC players
Club Athletico Paranaense players
Fluminense FC players
Bangu Atlético Clube players
Bonsucesso Futebol Clube players
Centro Sportivo Alagoano players
Bonsucesso Futebol Clube managers
Madureira Esporte Clube managers
Thailand national football team managers
América Futebol Clube (MG) managers
Thailand national under-17 football team managers
Al Shabab FC (Riyadh) managers
Rio Branco Atlético Clube managers
Botafogo de Futebol e Regatas managers
America Football Club (RJ) managers
Carlos Roberto
Carlos Roberto
Carlos Roberto
Al-Ta'ee managers
Saudi Professional League managers
Saudi First Division League managers
Manchester City F.C. non-playing staff
Association football midfielders
Footballers from Rio de Janeiro (city)